The European Volleyball Confederation (CEV) is the governing body for Volleyball in Europe. It organises three club competitions for women: the CEV Champions League (formerly European Cup), the CEV Cup (formerly Cup Winners Cup) and the CEV Challenge Cup, There is also the CEV Super Cup (it) but this competition is no longer Exist.

Russian side Dynamo Moscow have won a record total of 11 titles in women's CEV competitions, Two more than VC Uralochka-NTMK (Russia). The only team to have won every CEV women's club competition is Modena Volley from (Italy).

Italian clubs have won the most titles (56), ahead of clubs from the Soviet Union (33) and Turkey (16). 
Italy is the only country in European women's volleyball history whose clubs won the three main competitions in the same season in six occasion in : 1996—97, 1999—20, 2004—05, 2005—06, 2008—09 and 2018—19.

Winners

By club
Dynamo Moscow is the most crowned one in CEV Champions League with 11 titles record, in CEV Cup CSKA Moscow comes first with 4 titles and in the CEV Challenge Cup USC Münster from (Germany) and Reggio Emilia Volley (Italy) share the record with 3 titles each. 
The following table lists all the women's clubs that have won at least one CEV club competition, and is updated as of 22 May 2022 (in chronological order).

Key

By country
The following table lists all the countries whose clubs have won at least one CEV competition, and is updated as of 22 May 2022 (in chronological order).

See also
European Volleyball Confederation
Clubs with the most international titles in volleyball

References

External links
 CEV Official Website 
 

 

Volleyball-related lists

Volleyball